Insulin-like growth factor-binding protein 6 (IGFBP-6) is a protein that in humans is encoded by the IGFBP6 gene.

References

Further reading